Gustav "Skädda" Sandberg (29 July 1888 – 8 February 1956) was a Swedish football (soccer) player who competed in the 1912 Summer Olympics. He played as a midfielder one match in the main tournament.

References

External links
 Swedish squad in 1912 

1888 births
1956 deaths
Swedish footballers
Sweden international footballers
Örgryte IS players
Olympic footballers of Sweden
Footballers at the 1912 Summer Olympics
Association football midfielders
Footballers from Gothenburg